Elmer Wachtel (1864-1929) was an American painter who lived and worked in Southern California.  He was known for his impressionist landscapes.

Biography 
Wachtel was born in Baltimore, Maryland on January 21, 1864.  He moved to California in 1882 to live with his brother, who was working in San Gabriel. Wachtel worked as a ranch hand and as a furniture store clerk while saving money to attend art school.  He also worked as a violinist, playing for the Philharmonic Orchestra of Los Angeles.  Wachtel was largely self-taught as a painter.  He studied at the Art Students' League in New York for two months and then later at the Lambeth School of Art in London.  Wachtel married sculptor Marion Kavanagh in 1904; the two lived in the Arroyo Seco region of Los Angeles.  Wachtel was known for painting California's landscapes, rather than European landscapes. On August 31, 1929, Wachtel died suddenly while on a painting trip in Guadalajara, Mexico.

During World War I, Wachtel became an informant for the U.S. Department of Justice by reporting to federal law authorities alleged pro-German and antiwar statements by militant socialists and fellow artists.<ref name=FBI>[https://hollywoodoblivion.com/rob-wagners-script-archive/#jp-carousel-290  FBI files]</ref>

See also
Artists of the Arroyo Seco (Los Angeles)

 References Hollywood Bohemia: The Roots of Progressive Politics in Rob Wagner's Script'' by Rob Leicester Wagner (Janaway Publishing, 2016)

1864 births
1929 deaths
American Impressionist painters
Painters from California
19th-century American painters
American male painters
20th-century American painters
19th-century American male artists
20th-century American male artists